Ki mit tud? (literally "Who knows what?") was a multi-genre talent show on the Hungarian National Television spanning 10 seasons between 1962-1996. Achieving great popularity in the 1960s, Ki mit tud? helped to launch the career of many artists who later became household names in the country, including actors like János Gálvölgyi or András Kern, singers like Kati Kovács, Zsuzsa Koncz, Judith Szűcs or Zorán Sztevanovity, and bands like Hungária, Metro or Pokolgép.

Concept

Ki mit tud? was originally conceived as a country-wide talent search, with contestants coming from city-, county-, and finally - the televised, live - country-wide finals. A wide array of genres were judged separately, covering nearly all fields of performing arts: vocal music (including pop, rock, opera, folk), instrumental music (including classical, jazz, dance, pop and rock), verse reading, folk and contemporary dance, and "other" genres (including circus productions, magic shows, stand-up comedy, pantomime or puppetry). The 1988 contest also welcomed amateur film submissions. The jury usually included a number of well-known faces from the country's theatric and music and art scene. Prizes ranged from common household wares to a trip to the next World Festival of Youth, or after the 1980s, luxury trips to exotic countries.

Series overview

Importance

Ki mit tud? presented a premier chance for performers of all genres to showcase their talents in front of a wider audience - similar to what Táncdalfesztivál meant for musicians.

During the 1960s-1970s, Ki mit tud? became the most-viewed show on National Television. According to the rudimentary statistics of the time, the finals were viewed by 88% of the population. Utilizing regional quarter- and semi-finals, the contest mobilized a large number of participants. 1965's show had 28,642 registered contestants performing in 7842 shows, watched by a live audience totaling to 180,000.

The contest rounds in cities and counties established a country-wide tradition of institutional (e.g. schoolwide) and regional talent contests, with similar events called Ki mit tud? held frequently even today.

Sources

 István, Kollega Tarsoly. A magyar televíziózás műfajai, Vetélkedők Magyarországon a XX. században III. - Kultúra, művészet, sport és szórakozás. Szekszárd : Babits Kiadó, 1998.

References

Hungarian television shows
Talent shows
1990s Hungarian television series
1980s Hungarian television series
1970s Hungarian television series
1960s Hungarian television series
1996 Hungarian television series endings
1962 Hungarian television series debuts
Magyar Televízió original programming